Francis Malbone Jr. (March 20, 1759June 4, 1809) was an American merchant from Newport, Rhode Island.  His father, Francis Sr., and his uncle, Evan, were active in the slave trade in Rhode Island. He held the rank of captain in the Rhode Island Militia and served as the commanding officer of the Artillery Company of Newport from 1792 until his death.

He represented Rhode Island in the U.S. House from March 4, 1793 until March 3, 1797 and served briefly as a Federalist in the United States Senate from March 4, 1809 to his death three months later.

He died on the steps of the Capitol building in Washington, D.C. and is buried in the Congressional Cemetery in that city.

See also
List of United States Congress members who died in office (1790–1899)

External links

1759 births
1809 deaths
Politicians from Newport, Rhode Island
American people of English descent
Federalist Party members of the United States House of Representatives from Rhode Island
Federalist Party United States senators from Rhode Island
Members of the Rhode Island House of Representatives
Burials at the Congressional Cemetery